The Georgia State University College of Law is a law school located in downtown Atlanta, Georgia. Founded in 1982, it is accredited by the American Bar Association and is a member of the Association of American Law Schools.

In addition to the Juris Doctor degree, the college offers joint degree programs with other colleges at Georgia State University.

The college offers a full-time and a part-time program. The cost of tuition at GSU Law for the 2018–2019 academic year is $17,050 for residents and $36,659 for non-residents.

History
As far back as the early 1970s, Georgia legislators and academic leaders debated  establishing a new law school. The Georgia State University College of Law finally was sanctioned by the state’s Board of Regents in 1981 and Ben F. Johnson became its first dean.

The college enrolled 200 students in its inaugural year, taught by six professors.  Most students were part-time, and many took classes at night, because they had full-time jobs during the day. The college’s first seven graduates were hooded in December 1984.

By the end of its first decade, full-time faculty had grown to 31, nearly half of whom were women.

Rankings
Georgia State University College of Law is currently ranked as the 78th best law school by U.S. News & World Report (2022). The College of Law also boasts a strong Health Law program (currently ranked 3rd nationally) and a large part-time program (ranked 17th nationally).  The school was ranked 42nd by Above The Law in 2019 using metrics that focus more on student outcomes rather than inputs. Additionally, GSU was named by Princeton Review in its 2013 edition of The Best 168 Law Schools.

Tuition
The cost of tuition at GSU Law for the 2018-2019 academic year is $17,050 for residents and $36,659 for non-residents.

Admissions
In 2021, incoming  Georgia State law students had a median GPA of 3.55 and a median LSAT score of 160.

Clinical programs
The school has a number of legal clinics, such as the Phillip C. Cook Low-Income Taxpayer Clinic, which serves low-income taxpayers.

Study abroad
The school operates the Summer Academy in International Commercial Arbitration, a five-week, six-credit hour study abroad program based in Linz, Austria. the Buenos Aires Summer Program in Argentina (jointly sponsored with the Florida International University College of Law); and the Summer Legal and Policy Study in Rio de Janeiro, Brazil.

Employment 
According to Georgia State's official 2018 ABA-required disclosures, 71.5% of the Class of 2018 obtained full-time, long-term, JD-required employment nine months after graduation. Georgia State's Law School Transparency under-employment score is 13.4%, indicating the percentage of the Class of 2018 unemployed, pursuing an additional degree, or working in a non-professional, short-term, or part-time job nine months after graduation.

Notable alumni
 Judiciary
Shawn LaGrua, J.D. 1987 - Associate Justice, Supreme Court of Georgia
John "Trea" Pipkin III, J.D. 2005 - Judge, Georgia Court of Appeals
Barbara Swinton, J.D. 1991 - Judge, Oklahoma Court of Civil Appeals
Cynthia J. Becker, J.D. 1987 - Judge, DeKalb County Superior Court
Bill Hamrick, J.D. 1991 - Superior Court Judge, Coweta Judicial Circuit; former member of the Georgia State Senate (D-30); incoming Georgia State-wide Business Court judge
Charles M. Eaton Jr, J.D. 2012 - Superior Court Judge, Atlanta Judicial Circuit; former member of the Georgia Public Service Commission
 Government
Glenn Richardson, J.D. 1984 - Former Speaker of the Georgia House of Representatives (2005-2010)
 Cynthia Coffman, J.D. 1991 - 38th Attorney General of Colorado
 Keisha Lance Bottoms, J.D. 1996 - Director of the White House Office of Public Engagement and Senior Advisor to the President; former Mayor of Atlanta; former member of the Atlanta City Council
 Steve Tumlin, J.D. 1988 - Mayor of Marietta, Georgia
 Curt Thompson, J.D. 1993 - Former member of the Georgia State Senate (D-5); former member of the Georgia House of Representatives (69th District)
 Rich Golick, J.D. 1997 - Former member of the Georgia House of Representatives (40th District)
 Trey Kelley, J.D. 2014 - Current member of the Georgia House of Representatives (16th District)
 Sam Park, J.D. 2013 - Current member of the Georgia House of Representatives (101st District)
 Matt Ramsey, J.D. 2005 - Former member of the Georgia House of Representatives (72nd District); House Majority Whip (2013-2016)
Stephen Dickson, J.D. 1999 - 18th Administrator of the Federal Aviation Administration
Nika Rurua, J.D. 2001 - Former member of the Cabinet of Georgia (country)
 Other notable alumni
Claudia Brind-Woody, J.D. 1999 - IBM executive
Stan Case, J.D. 1996 - News anchor of CNN Radio (1985-2011)
Jimmy Faircloth, J.D. 1990 - Lawyer in Alexandria-Pineville, Louisiana, former executive counsel to Governor Bobby Jindal.
Emily Jacobson, J.D./MBA 2014 - Olympic saber fencer
Notable faculty
 Paul A. Lombardo, Professor of Law - Senior Advisor to the Presidential Commission for the Study of Bioethical Issues
 Thomas W. Thrash, Professor of Law (1986-1997) - Judge, United States District Court for the Northern District of Georgia

See also
 Georgia State University Law Review

References

External links
College of Law
Academic Programs and Centers
Georgia State University

Law schools in Georgia (U.S. state)
Georgia State University